Thomas "Tommy" Erdos (born 30 October 1963) is a Brazilian auto racing driver. He has raced for most of his career in Great Britain and Europe, where he currently resides in Buckinghamshire England with his partner Sheila. He has three children.

Racing career

Early career
His first racing was with single-seaters in 1988, in the British Formula First Championship. His impressive start to racing saw him finish as runner up in his first season, with eleven podiums, including five race wins. A year later he raced in the Formula Ford 2000 Championship, finishing in third, with three race wins. In 1990, he stepped up to British Formula Renault. His nine podium finishes, including four race wins, was enough to win him the championship. Whilst testing for Formula Three at the end of the season, he was involved in a serious accident which left him out of racing for a whole year.
He returned to racing with some success in Formula Renault in 1992 and 1994, with a year in Formula 3 in-between. He also worked as an Instructor for the Jim Russell Racing School in 1993, for three years.

GT and Le Mans Part 1
In 1995 he moved into GT racing, driving a Marcos LM600, he drove in the BRDC GT Championship for Team Marcos. His first year in GTs saw him get four class wins, along with one outright win. This year also saw his first drive in the Le Mans 24 Hour race. Still with Team Marcos alongside Chris Hodgetts and Cor Euser, the race ended in retirement.
A drive for Marcos Racing International in the BPR Global Endurance GT series, saw him finish third in the GT2 class at the end of the season in 1996. Again, his race in the Le Mans 24 Hour race ended in retirement with Cor Euser and Pascal Dro. In the BRDC GT Championship he drove in just a few selected races. For 1997 he first raced for Cirtek Motorsport in a Ford Saleen Mustang GT2, before switching to AJL Racing, where he drove a Jaguar XJ220 GT1, where he achieved four podium finishes. He also drove in two rounds of the FIA GT Championship for Cirtek Motorsport. Yet again his race in the Le Mans 24 Hour ended in a retirement.
In 1998 he raced in several different cars in BRDC GT Championship, including a TVR Cerbera GT2, a Porsche 911 GT2 and finally back with a Marcos LM600 for NCK Racing, which he continued with in 1999 and 2000. Also in 1999, he finished in twenty-second place overall in the Le Mans 24 Hours. His Chrysler Viper GTS-R finished the race but struggled with mechanical problems.
In 2000 he drove in one round of the ALMS at the Nürburgring, where he finished in second in a Chrysler Viper GTS-R for Chamberlain Motorsport.

BTCC
Erdos got a drive in the prestigious British Touring Car Championship in 2001. Originally the ABG Motorsport Team had planned to field two independent Lexus IS200s along with Kurt Luby. In the end only one car raced all season, with Erdos replacing Luby halfway through the season. Despite driving in only twelve rounds from a total of twenty-six, he managed to impress many people by challenging with the works team and finishing the season in seventh place in points. He was lined up for a possible drive in the BTCC in 2007 for Xero Competition, but the team failed to raise the funds needed.

GT and Le Mans Part 2
In January 2002 Erdos, together with Ian McKellar Jnr and Bobby Verdon-Roe, ran in the Daytona 24 Hours in a Saleen S7R entered by Graham Nash Motorsport (GNM).  The car was so new that it ran in unpainted carbon fibre. Erdos was fastest in class in the early stages despite running against the formidable Jaguar of Paul Gentilozzi.  However, alternator failures forced the team to 'park' the car after the opening few hours, using their remaining alternator to enable them to take the chequered flag by coming out to complete the final few laps.
 
For the 2002 season Erdos was paired with Ian McKellar Jnr in the British GT championship driving the same Saleen S7R run by GNM, now painted white, with support from several AD Group companies together with Mouchel Metro and Renault trucks South West. The pair won the championship and Erdos won the Top Gun award for achieving pole position at every round.

In the same year Erdos, together with Pedro Chaves and Gavin Pickering, was entered in the Saleen at Le Mans by GNM.

Erdos began 2003 at Daytona in the Rolex 24 and then Erdos contested the FIA GT Championship in a Saleen S7R entered by GNM.  His co-driver was Mike Newton and the car ran in the livery of Newton's AD Group of Companies. At Le Mans, the same car was run by Ray Mallock Ltd (RML) and Erdos' co drivers were Chaves and Newton.  They failed to finish after a gearbox failure in the 24th hour.

Erdos competed in the one off 1000 km race run on the Bugatti circuit at Le Mans in November 2003 in an MG EX257 with co-drivers Chris Goodwin and Newton.  The RML entry retired after 65 laps with mechanical failure.

Erdos was very busy in 2004 driving the MG EX257 in the inaugural Le Mans Endurance Series of 1000 km races together with Newton and Miguel Ramos and also sharing the Saleen with Newton in the FIA GT Championship.  Both cars were run by RML. He finished 5th in LMP1 class of the LMES and 6th in the GT class of the FIA GT Championship.  For Le Mans  he shared  the MG with  Newton  and  Nathan  Kinch  but a  good run was ended by engine failure.

He once again started the 2005 season at the Rolex 24 at Daytona resulting in a  best finish of 4th in  the DP  class and 7th  overall. At Le Mans  he shared  the MG  with  Newton  and Warren Hughes  this time with Judd V8  power. A  disastrous  start with the car overheating on lap 1  and visiting the pits  to have the cooling system bled  and replenished  left them last  in class. However, a remarkable comeback  with Hughes  and  Erdos setting fastest lap times throughout the night  resulted in a class win by 4pm on Sunday.   In the Le Mans  Series  Erdos looked set to win the P2  class,  but, in the last round in Turkey, a  startline  incident involving Jean-Marc Gounon resulted in the MG making heavy contact with the pitwall. A  remarkable  feat of  pit work  by the RML  crew saw the car rebuilt in record time. They  rejoined the race and  climbed back up the field to be beaten to the championship by  one point.

For 2006  the MG  returned to Le Mans with AER  power and this time, class victory was achieved  from the front.  Sharing with Newton  and Andy Wallace  the Erdos finished 8th  overall  after an almost trouble free run. At the final round of the  LMS  series  in Jarama, Spain,  Erdos  was once again  heading for championship  victory having dominated the class throughout the season. An engine  failure  minutes before the end of the race meant  that,  once again,  he just missed out on the top prize.

Le Mans was less kind to him in 2007  when retirement  followed an accident in the Porsche Curves  whilst Andy  Wallace  was driving.  However,  the LMS series finally came Erdos'  way that season  with victory in the P2  class.

Racing record

Complete British GT Championship results
(key) (Races in bold indicate pole position) (Races in italics indicate fastest lap)
{| class="wikitable" style="text-align:center; font-size:85%"
! Year
! Team
! Car
! Class
! 1
! 2
! 3
! 4
! 5
! 6
! 7
! 8
! 9
! 10
! 11
! 12
! 13
! 14
! Pos
! Points
|-
| 1995
! Marcos Cars
! Marcos LM600
! GT2
|style="background:#;"| SIL1
|style="background:#;"| DON1
|style="background:#;"| DON2
|style="background:#;"| SIL1
|style="background:#;"| SIL2
|style="background:#EFCFFF;"| THR1
|style="background:#FFFFBF;"| OUL1
|style="background:#FFFFBF;"| BRH1
|style="background:#FFFFBF;"| BRH2
|style="background:#FFFFFF;"| SNE1
|style="background:#FFFFFF;"| SNE2
|style="background:#DFFFDF;"| SIL1
|
|
! 11th
! 23
|-
| rowspan=2| 1996
! rowspan=2| Marcos Racing International 
! Marcos LM600
! GT2
|style="background:#FFFFBF;"| SIL1
|style="background:#;"| DON1
|style="background:#;"| BRH1
|style="background:#;"| DON1
|style="background:#FFFFBF;"| THR1
|style="background:#;"| SNE1
|style="background:#;"| OUL1
|style="background:#;"| SIL1
|
|
|
|
|
|
! 12th
! 46
|-
! Marcos LM500
! GT3
|style="background:#;"| SIL1
|style="background:#;"| DON1
|style="background:#;"| BRH1
|style="background:#;"| DON1
|style="background:#;"| THR1
|style="background:#;"| SNE1
|style="background:#DFDFDF;"| OUL1
|style="background:#DFFFDF;"| SIL1
|
|
|
|
|
|
! 12th
! 26
|-
| rowspan=2| 1997
! Cirtek Motorsport
! Saleen Mustang
! GT2
|style="background:#;"| SIL1
|style="background:#;"| BRH1
|style="background:#;"| DON1
|style="background-color:#000000; color:white"| OUL1
|style="background:#;"| SIL1
|style="background:#;"| CRO1
|style="background:#;"| BRH1
|style="background:#;"| DON1
|style="background:#;"| SIL1
|
|
|
|
|
! NC
! 0
|-
! Saleen Allen Speedlab
! Jaguar XJ220
! GT1
|style="background:#;"| SIL1
|style="background:#;"| BRH1
|style="background:#;"| DON1
|style="background:#;"| OUL1
|style="background:#DFDFDF;"| SIL1
|style="background:#DFFFDF;"| DON1
|style="background:#DFDFDF;"| BRH1
|style="background:#FFDF9F;"| CRO1
|style="background:#FFDF9F;"| SIL1
|
|
|
|
|
! 11th
! 64
|-
| rowspan=3| 1998
! Harrogate Horseless Carriages TVR
! TVR Cerbera
! rowspan=3| GT2
|style="background:#;"| SIL1
|style="background:#DFFFDF;"| OUL1
|style="background:#;"| CRO1
|style="background:#EFCFFF;"| SNE1
|style="background:#;"| SIL1
|style="background:#;"| DON1
|style="background:#;"| SIL1
|style="background:#;"| SPA1
|style="background:#;"| SIL1
|
|
|
|
|
! rowspan=3| 17th
! rowspan=3| 53
|-
! Gerard Macquillan
! Porsche 911 GT2
|style="background:#;"| SIL1
|style="background:#;"| OUL1
|style="background:#;"| CRO1
|style="background:#;"| SNE1
|style="background:#CFCFFF;"| SIL1
|style="background:#;"| DON1
|style="background:#;"| SIL1
|style="background:#;"| SPA1
|style="background:#;"| SIL1
|
|
|
|
|
|-
! NCK Racing
! Marcos LM600
|style="background:#;"| SIL1
|style="background:#;"| OUL1
|style="background:#;"| CRO1
|style="background:#;"| SNE1
|style="background:#;"| SIL1
|style="background:#EFCFFF;"| DON1
|style="background:#FFDF9F;"| SIL1
|style="background:#FFFFBF;"| SPA1
|style="background:#DFDFDF;"| SIL1
|
|
|
|
|
|-
| 1999
! Marcos Cars/NCK Motorsport
! Marcos LM600
! GT2
|style="background:#FFDF9F;"| SIL1
|style="background:#FFDF9F;"| SIL1
|style="background:#EFCFFF;"| SNE1
|style="background:#DFDFDF;"| BRH1
|style="background:#FFDF9F;"| SIL1
|style="background:#EFCFFF;"| DON1
|style="background:#FFDF9F;"| DON2
|style="background:#EFCFFF;"| SIL1
|style="background:#EFCFFF;"| CRO1
|style="background:#EFCFFF;"| SPA1
|style="background:#DFDFDF;"| SIL1
|
|
|
! 8th
! 78
|-
| 2000
! NCK Motorsport
! Marcos LM600
! GT
|style="background:#FFFFFF;"| THR1
|style="background:#EFCFFF;"| CRO1
|style="background:#EFCFFF;"| OUL1
|style="background:#EFCFFF;"| DON1
|style="background:#DFFFDF;"| SIL1
|style="background:#DFFFDF;"| BRH1
|style="background:#EFCFFF;"| DON1
|style="background:#FFDF9F;"| CRO1
|style="background:#DFFFDF;"| SIL1
|style="background:#EFCFFF;"| SNE1
|style="background:#EFCFFF;"| SPA1
|style="background:#DFFFDF;"| SIL1
|
|
! 16th
! 33
|-
| 2002
! Graham Nash Motorsport
! Saleen S7-R
! GT
|style="background:#FFFFBF;"| BRH1
|style="background:#EFCFFF;"| DON1
|style="background:#FFFFBF;"| SIL1
|style="background:#FFFFBF;"| KNO1
|style="background:#FFFFBF;"| CRO1
|style="background:#FFFFBF;"| SIL1
|style="background:#DFDFDF;"| CAS1
|style="background:#FFFFBF;"| ROC1
|style="background:#FFFFBF;"| OUL1
|style="background:#DFDFDF;"| SNE1
|style="background:#FFFFBF;"| THR1
|style="background:#DFDFDF;"| DON1
|
|
! style="background:#FFFFBF;"| 1st
! style="background:#FFFFBF;"| 260
|-
| 2003
! Rollcentre with Balfe Motorsport
! Mosler MT900R
! GTO
|style="background:#;"| DON1
|style="background:#;"| SNE1
|style="background:#;"| KNO1
|style="background:#;"| KNO2
|style="background:#;"| SIL1
|style="background:#;"| CAS1
|style="background:#;"| OUL1|style="background:#;"| ROC1
|style="background:#;"| THR1
|style="background:#DFDFDF;"| SPA1
|style="background:#;"| BRH1
|
|
|
! 34th
! 20
|-
| 2007
! Damax
! Ascari KZ1-R
! GT3
|style="background:#CFCFFF;"| OUL1
|style="background:#EFCFFF;"| OUL2
|style="background:#CFCFFF;"| DON1
|style="background:#DFFFDF;"| DON2
|style="background:#;"| SNE1
|style="background:#CFCFFF;"| BRH1
|style="background:#DFFFDF;"| BRH2
|style="background:#EFCFFF;"| SIL1
|style="background:#EFCFFF;"| THR1
|style="background:#CFCFFF;"| THR2
|style="background:#;"| CRO1
|style="background:#;"| CRO2
|style="background:#CFCFFF;"| ROC1
|style="background:#DFFFDF;"| ROC2
! 25th
! 4
|-
| 2013
! Balfe Motorsport
! Ferrari 458 Italia GT3
! GT3
|style="background:#;"| OUL1
|style="background:#;"| OUL2
|style="background:#DFFFDF;"| ROC1
|style="background:#;"| SIL1
|style="background:#;"| SNE1
|style="background:#;"| SNE2
|style="background:#;"| BRH1
|style="background:#;"| ZAN1
|style="background:#;"| ZAN2
|style="background:#;"| DON1
|
|
|
|
! 32nd
! 1.5
|-
|}
† — Drivers did not finish the race, but were classified as they completed over 90% of the race distance.

Complete British Touring Car Championship results
(key) (Races in bold' indicate pole position – 1 point awarded all races) (Races in italics'' indicate fastest lap – 1 point awarded all races) (* signifies that driver lead feature race for at least one lap – 1 point awarded)

24 Hours of Le Mans results

References

External links
 Official website
 

Brazilian racing drivers
British Formula Renault 2.0 drivers
British Touring Car Championship drivers
British GT Championship drivers
24 Hours of Le Mans drivers
European Le Mans Series drivers
Brazilian Jews
1965 births
Living people
Place of birth missing (living people)
24 Hours of Spa drivers
Sports car racing team owners
Cheever Racing drivers
United Autosports drivers
EuroInternational drivers